Sensational (born Colin Julius Bobb, October 18, 1974, in Guyana) is a hip-hop performer from New York.

Biography
According to the film The Rise and Fall and Rise of Sensational he got into music at a young age, including reggae and calypso. He was later led to hip-hop and was known to rap over Stockhausen records. According to the film, Sensational is the nephew of Edgar Rose, who played on a popular calypso song called "Labour Day." In the mid-90s he made his debut working with the Jungle Brothers under the name Torture, and appeared on the single "Troopin' On The Downlow." He was later heavily featured on the unreleased Jungle Brothers album Crazy Wisdom Masters in 1993 (produced by Bill Laswell) but this was shelved by Warner Bros, due to having been too "experimental." After taking time out from music-related activity, in 1997 he signed to Spectre's label Wordsound, changed his name to Sensational and released his debut album Loaded With Power.

His style is considered unique and different.  On his debut he was forced to use his headphone cans as a makeshift microphone, and used sounds from old analogue equipment and found sounds which were recorded and then looped. His style is often about weed intake or sci-fi based themes. He is known more for his often eclectic collaboration work, having played with the likes of Cardopusher, Kid 606, Handsome Boy Modeling School, DJ Scotch Bonnet, Kouhei Matsunaga, and Spectre. Often quite prolific, but known for brief spells of homelessness, it is not known how much of Sensational's discography there actually is, as he can often be found selling his music on the streets of New York.

Discography
Loaded With Power (1997)		
Corner The Market (1999)		
Heavyweighter (2000)		
Get on My Page (2001)		
Spectre Featuring Sensational – Parts Unknown (2002)		
Natural Shine (2002)		
Mix Hits on a Fritz (2003)		
Crown Material (2005)		
Speaks For Itself (2005)		
Sensational Meets Kouhei (2006)		
Sensational, Göldin & Bit-Tuner – It's Sensational (2008)		
Sensational & Spectre – Acid & Bass (2009)		
Sensational Meets Koyxeи – Sensational Meets Koyxeи  (2010)
Sensational & Ciroyelle – Connected Spirits (2019)

References
this article incorporates information the documentary Rise and Fall and Rise of Sensational.

East Coast hip hop musicians
1974 births
Living people